Reeve Jefferson Carney (born April 18, 1983) is an American actor and singer-songwriter. He is best known for originating the role of Peter Parker/Spider-Man in Spider-Man: Turn Off the Dark on Broadway and playing Orpheus in the original Broadway cast of the Tony Award-winning musical Hadestown. He also played Dorian Gray in the Showtime series Penny Dreadful, and Riff Raff in the Fox musical television film The Rocky Horror Picture Show: Let's Do the Time Warp Again.

Early life
Reeve Carney was born and raised in the West Village area of Manhattan with his brother Zane and sister Paris. He grew up in a family of musicians and actors: his father, John, was a songwriter for commercials, his mother, Marti, was a singer, actress and a jewelry designer and his great uncle was Academy Award-winning actor Art Carney. He learned how to play the piano at a young age, and began singing for radio and television commercials. At the age of 8, he was chosen to sing in a live performance and video at Lincoln Center's Avery Fisher Hall with Peter, Paul and Mary. Two years later, he recorded a song with a children's choir on Michael Jackson's album, HIStory.

To get a music education, Carney attended the Academy of Music at Alexander Hamilton High School in Los Angeles with his brother, Zane, and future bandmates Aiden Moore and Jon Epcar. He went on to study at the University of Southern California Thornton School of Music, majoring in studio jazz guitar.

Career

Music 
Carney started to play guitar at age 12 and three years later he was playing guitar professionally at B.B King's night club in Los Angeles. When living in California, Carney released his first EP Looking Glass in 2004 and promoted it by performing with other musicians, including Jonny Lang. At age 22 he signed with Interscope and formed his jazz-infused rock namesake band, Carney, consisting of Carney (songwriter, vocals and guitar), his brother Zane (guitar), Aiden Moore (bass) and Jon Epcar (drums). The band's vision led the manager David Sonenberg to work with them. Carney released their first EP Nothing Without You in 2008 and their debut album, Mr. Green Vol. 1, in May 2010. In 2009 the band went on tour with The Veronicas in their Revenge Is Sweeter world tour and in 2011 they opened for Arcade Fire and U2 in Moncton, Canada on July 30 on the final date of the U2 360° Tour.

When acting on Broadway, Carney was invited to be part of the album Broadway's Carols for a Cure in 2011 ("St. Nicholas Sky" ft T.V. Carpio) and 2013 ("A Savior is Born"). Carney also recorded the single "Rise Above 1" with Bono and The Edge in 2011, an adapted song from the musical Spider-Man: Turn Off the Dark. Apart from making his own music, Carney also writes songs for soundtracks for films such as The Tempest (2010) and The Twilight Saga: Breaking Dawn, Part 2 (2012). In October 2016 Carney released his debut solo album, Youth Is Wasted, which he wrote and produced himself. Since then Carney was on tour two times (Reeve Carney Fall Tour 2016 and Youth Is Wasted Tour 2017). Three songs from his album as well as the album itself were nominated in six categories on the 16th annual Independent Music Awards (The IMAs). "Think of You" won "Best Song – Acoustic", "Resurrection" won "Best Song – Rock or Hard Rock" and the album won "Best Album – Adult Contemporary".

Acting 
Carney made his first appearance on the big screen in the film The Saint of Fort Washington (1993) with a small role. In 1999, Carney got the role of the young Ishmael Chambers in the film Snow Falling on Cedars. His performance received favorable reviews and subsequently earned him the "Best Performance in a Feature Film" on 2000 Young Artists Awards. Carney was part of the cast of a few films as a child actor before he decided to focus totally on music. In 2010, he was hand-picked by the director Julie Taymor to play Ferdinand in a film adaptation of William Shakespeare's play The Tempest. Taymor also cast Carney for the lead role of Spider-Man in Spider-Man: Turn Off the Dark on Broadway. During the auditions, Bono and The Edge, the show's musical composers, were surprised by Carney's vocals and he ended up being chosen for the role. He starred for 3 years as Spider-Man which began previews in November 2010. The rest of his bandmates performed as part of the pit orchestra for Turn Off the Dark. He played his final performance on Sunday, September 15, 2013. Meanwhile, in 2012, Carney played Taylor Swift's love interest in her "I Knew You Were Trouble" music video. Swift was a fan of Carney's band and came up with the idea.

In 2014, Carney was cast as Dorian Gray in the Showtime series Penny Dreadful. The show had three seasons (2014–2016). During the filming of the last season of Penny Dreadful, Carney was on Kenny Ortega's radar to play Riff Raff, the Handyman, on Fox's remake of The Rocky Horror Picture Show. He got the role on the two-hour musical television film and recorded three of the songs on the film's soundtrack. The film premiered on the Fox network on October 20, 2016.

In 2017, Reeve Carney joined the cast of the Citadel Theatre production of Hadestown as Orpheus. The production reunited Carney with his Spider-Man co-stars Patrick Page and T.V. Carpio. Carney continued with the musical for its run at the Royal National Theatre in 2018 and reprised the role in the Broadway production, which began previews on March 22 and opened on April 17, 2019.

Discography

As solo artist

Studio albums

Extended plays

Live albums

Soundtracks and cast albums

Singles

As part of Carney

Studio albums

Extended plays

Other appearances

Filmography

Film

Television

Theatre

Music video appearances

Awards and nominations

Notes

References

External links
 Official website
 
 "Web Slinger Is Poised to Cast Net", The New York Times, September 8, 2010

1983 births
21st-century American male actors
Alexander Hamilton High School (Los Angeles) alumni
American male film actors
American male singer-songwriters
American male musical theatre actors
American male television actors
American tenors
Grammy Award winners
Living people
Male actors from New York City
People from Greenwich Village
Singer-songwriters from New York (state)
USC Thornton School of Music alumni